Piatigorsky, a Jewish surname of Russian origin (means "from Pyatigorsk"), may refer to:
 Alexander Piatigorsky, Russian philosopher
 Anton Piatigorsky, Canadian-American playwright and writer
 Gregor Piatigorsky, cellist
 Jacqueline Piatigorsky, née Rotschild, chess and tennis player and philanthropist, wife of G. Piatogorsky
 Leonid Piatigorsky, Soviet physicist